Marianna S. Safronova is an American scientist involved in theoretical atomic physics.

Career
Safronova received her Ph.D. in physics from the University of Notre Dame in 2001 and joined the National Institute for Standards and Technology (NIST) in 2001 as a guest researcher. In 2003, she accepted a faculty position at the University of Delaware in the Department of Physics and Astronomy where she is currently a Professor. She is also an Adjunct Fellow at the Joint Quantum Institute,  NIST and University of Maryland, College Park. Her research interests include the study of fundamental symmetries, atomic clocks, searches for the variation in fundamental constants, optical cooling and trapping of neutral atoms, and the development of high-precision methods for calculating atomic properties. She is a Fellow of the American Physical Society and a member of the Editorial board of the Physical Review A. In December 2011, Safronova was elected as an APS fellow for her "innovative development of high-accuracy first-principles methods of computational atomic structure and dynamics and their application to optical atomic clocks, quantum computing with neutral atoms and tests of fundamental symmetries." In 2012, Safronova received the American Physical Society's Woman Physicist of the Month award for August in recognition of her accomplishments as a researcher and mentor.

In 2011, Safronova and colleagues gained widespread media attention when they reported on their atomic clock research at a national conference. The researchers devised a new calculation to aid ultra-precise timekeeping, findings that could potentially lead to the development of an atomic clock that loses only a second in about 32 billion years — more than twice the estimated age of the universe. Only four years later in 2015, the latest modification of a record-setting strontium atomic clock achieved precision and stability levels that now meant the clock would neither gain nor lose one second in some 15 billion years— roughly the age of the universe.

Safronova is also known for her community leadership, often taking on key roles at annual conferences organized by the American Physical Society.

In 2021, Safronova played a leading role in creating an online portal that allows atomic structure calculations to be accessible to the public. The portal focuses on neutral and ionized atomic species that are of experimental interest. As of 2022, Safronova and her team are in the process of expanding this portal to several other atoms.

Education 
B.Sc and M.Sc  Moscow State University, Department of Physics, Quantum statistics and Field theory group, Moscow, Russia (1988–1994). Thesis title: Renormalization of Topological Yang-Mills Theory. 
Ph.D, Department of Physics, University of Notre Dame (1994–2001). Thesis title: High-precision Calculations of Atomic Properties and Parity Nonconservation in Systems with One Valence Electron. Ph. D. Advisor: Walter R. Johnson.

Research 
Safronova is an expert in the field of theoretical atomic physics. She studies weak interactions in heavy atoms, ultracold atoms and atomic clocks. She also develops high-precision methodologies for the calculation of atomic properties and applications of such calculations. Her research involves both the study of the fundamental physics problems (search for new physics with atomic systems) and applications of atomic physics to future technological developments. She is the author of over 160 peer-reviewed scientific articles and over 140 presentations at colloquia, seminars, and conferences in the US and abroad.

References 

Moscow State University alumni
University of Notre Dame alumni
Living people
Women physicists
Year of birth missing (living people)
Fellows of the American Physical Society